Cypher is an alternative spelling for cipher.

Cypher may also refer to:

Arts and entertainment
 Cypher (French Group), a Goa trance music group
 Cypher (band), an Australian instrumental band
 Cypher (film), a 2002 film
 Cypher (...And Oceans album)
 Cypher (Spektr album)
 in breakdancing, a circle of b-boys who take turns dancing in the center
 in poetry slam, a circle of poets who take turns reciting poems
 in freestyle rap, a circle of rappers who take turns freestyling or performing a freeverse

Characters
 Cypher (Marvel Comics) (a.k.a. Doug Ramsey), a Marvel Comics character
 Cypher (DC Comics) (a.k.a. Avery Twombey), a DC Comics super-villain and adversary of Batman
 Cypher (Warhammer 40,000), a character in the Warhammer 40,000 universe
 Richard Cypher (also known as Richard Rahl), the protagonist of The Sword of Truth series
 Cypher, a Judas-like character in the film The Matrix
 The title character of Johnny Cypher in Dimension Zero, a 1950s-era cartoon program
 Cypher/Kerry Turner, a sidekick of the Christian superhero Bibleman
 The sword-like weapon of Strider Hiryu, a character from the Strider Hiryu manga and various related videogames
 A character in the Higher Institute of Villainous Education book series, first introduced in the second book The Overlord Protocol
 Cypher, the female main antagonist of the film The Fate of the Furious

People Jon Cypher (born 1932), American actor
 Julie Cypher (born 1964), American film director, also known as the former partner of Melissa Etheridge
 Alexey "Cypher" Yanushevsky, Belarusian professional Quake player

Other uses
 Cypher (UAV), an unmanned aerial vehicle
 The Cypher (video game), release in 1998
 Cypher (video game), released in 2012
 Cypher stent, a type of drug-eluting stent
 Cypher Query Language, a declarative query language for graph databases
 Royal cypher

See also
 Monogram
 Cipher (disambiguation)
 Cyphers